Khampheng Saysompheng is a Laotian politician who served as Minister of Labour and Social Welfare. 

He is the husband of Viengthong Siphandone.

References

Specific

Bibliography
Books:
 

Year of birth missing (living people)
Living people
Members of the 9th Central Committee of the Lao People's Revolutionary Party
Members of the 10th Central Committee of the Lao People's Revolutionary Party
Members of the 11th Central Committee of the Lao People's Revolutionary Party
Lao People's Revolutionary Party politicians